Julius Friedländer may refer to:

 Julius Friedländer (numismatist) (1813–1884), German numismatist
 Julius Friedländer (painter) (1810–1861), Danish painter
 Julius Reinhold Friedlander (1803–1839), American writer